Benito Perojo González   (Madrid, 14 June 1894 – Madrid, 11 November 1974) was a successful Spanish film director and film producer.

Biography 
Son of José Perojo Figueras (1850–1908), a journalist and politician of Cuban origin, by his wife, Ana Cortina Fuentes (1871–1954).

On 18 July 1966 he was honoured by the Caballero Gran Cruz de la Orden del Mérito Civil.

He died in Madrid on 11 November 1974 aged 80 and he was survived by his daughter Carmen Perojo Carreras.

Selected filmography

Director
 Malvaloca (1926)
 Restless Hearts (1928)
 La bodega (1929)
 The Charm of Seville (1931)
 Fog (1932)
 The Man Who Laughed at Love (1933)
 World Crisis (1934)
 Paloma Fair (1935)
 Bound for Cairo (1935)
 The Barber of Seville (1938)
Mariquilla Terremoto (1938)
Suspiros de España (1938)
La última Falla (1940)
 The Reluctant Hero (1941)
 Goyescas (1942)
 La Casta Susana (1944)
 Seven Women (1944)
Los majos de Cádiz (1946)
 The Songstress (1946)
La copla de la Dolores (1947)
 White Horse Inn (1948)
 Melancholic Autumn (1958, producer)

Producer
 The Adventures of Gil Blas (1956)
 The Fair of the Dove (1963)

References

External links 
 

Spanish film producers
Film directors from Madrid
1894 births
1974 deaths
Film producers from Madrid